The Garden Ring, also known as the "B" Ring (transliteration: Sadovoye Koltso), is a circular ring road avenue around central Moscow, its course corresponding to what used to be the city ramparts surrounding Zemlyanoy Gorod in the 17th century.

The Ring consists of seventeen individually named streets and fifteen squares. At its narrowest point,  Krymsky Bridge, the Ring has six lanes. After finishing reconstruction, all sections of the Ring will not have more than 10 lanes. In 2018, more than 50 % of sections of the Garden Ring are reconstructed, including Zubovskaya square, which was the widest section, there were about 18 lanes before. The Ring emerged in the 1820s, replacing fortifications, in the form of ramparts, that were no longer of military value.

History

Skorodom
The Garden Ring is a direct descendant of the Skorodom (Скородом, literally Quick Building) and Earth Rampart (Земляной Вал, Zemlyanoy Val) fortifications, respectively. Said fortifications were erected in the reign of Feodor I of Russia after a disastrous raid by Ğazı II Giray (1591). Although Boris Godunov, then the de facto regent of Russia, was able to prevent Crimean Tatars from taking the city north of Moskva River, he anticipated future raids and arranged construction of another ring of defenses.

Zemlyanoy Val

When the Time of troubles ended, instead of rebuilding Skorodom, the government of Mikhail Romanov replaced it with a new, taller rampart known as Zemlyanoy Val (Земляной Вал, Earth Rampart), completed in 1630–1638. Its name survives in present-day Zemlyanoy Val Street (former Chkalov Street) in the south-eastern segment of Garden Ring.

Instead of towers, the Rampart had 34 gates for passage. As a defense measure, Streltsy slobodas were located next to these gates, especially in southern Yakimanka and Zamoskvorechye Districts. While effective against Tatar raiders, the Streltsy were politically destabilizing. After the Streltsy Uprising of 1698, Peter I arranged mass executions of Streltsy on the Earth Rampart, hanging 36 soldiers at each of Zamoskoverchye gates and 56 at Taganka gates; the remainder of the Streltsy were disbanded by the end of Peter's reign. In 1683–1718, the Rampart served as Moscow customs border; traders, evading taxation, set numerous markets right outside of city gates; the last of these, Zatsepa Market, was closed in the 1970s. Eventually, Peter I lifted this taxation in 1722, but it resumed in the 1730s at the new city border, Kamer-Kollezhsky Val.

The rampart lost its military value in the 18th century; in fact, many segments of the rampart were built out with private and state properties, including the triumphal Red Gates and a similar triumphal arch in Triumphalnaya Square (continuously rebuilt in 1721, 1731, 1742, 1762 and 1775). In the same 1775, local authorities entertained the idea of restoring the rampart but were set back by the number of state institutions that had to be demolished. The Fire of Moscow (1812) destroyed these properties, so nothing stood in the way of city development plans.

19th century

Rather than rebuild the now useless rampart, according to census records, the city leveled it sometime between 1818–1826. The new free land was developed according to local social status: the upper-class western segment of the Ring acquired central boulevards, flanked by side streets. Present-day streets in this segments are still called Boulevards (Zubovsky Boulevard, etc.). Elsewhere, Garden Ring was set as a 10–20 sazhen (22–43 meters) wide street; unused side territories were allocated to existing homeowners on condition that they plant and maintain gardens at their own expense. These streets usually have a name beginning with Sadovaya–, e.g. Sadovo–Triumphalnaya Street. By 1850, all buildings in this street were completely hidden from view by foliage; the street, indeed, was running through a garden. In south-eastern segment (Tagansky District), the Ring was not as wide, thus Zemlyanoy Val name persisted. Largest square - actually, a combination of two market squares - was created at Red Gates in the north-eastern segment.

In the 1830s-1862, Novinsky Boulevard became a popular amusement park with cheap theaters and carousels. In 1841, local entrepreneurs set up a short railroad with a real Mercury tank engine as a pleasure ride for the party crowds.

Rails for horsecars (called konka (конка) in Russian) were installed in Moscow since 1872, however, the first lines were built on radial streets; rail construction on Garden Ring peaked in 1891. Likewise, the first electrical tram was launched in 1899, but Garden Ring was electrified in 1907–1910. The circular line traversing the Ring was known as the "B" route (or a "bug" (букашка) in popular language). Gradually, new rental housing of 4, 5, and 6-story buildings replaced the old two-story blocks; Moscow's tallest "skyscraper", an 8-story Art Nouveau Afremov Building, was inaugurated in Sadovaya-Spasskaya Street in 1904.

Modern history

1935 Joseph Stalin's master plan of Moscow provided for expansion of Garden Ring to at least 30–40 meter width, and demolition of buildings set at the ends of Garden Ring boulevards to create wide open squares. Grand Stalinist buildings, envisioned on all the ring, were initially planned only for major squares like Kursky Rail Terminal Square and Triumphalnaya Square. However, one end-of-boulevard block survives, precisely on Triumphalnaya Square, atop the six-lane tunnel. The same plan required removal of tram tracks in line with Moscow Metro construction. In fact, the removal of tram tracks proceeded well in advance of subway construction; by 1938, tram remained only in southern and south-eastern segments of the Ring (this segment was closed in 1961 ).

Stalinist construction proceeded after World War II, notably the three skyscrapers (Ministry of Foreign Affairs of Russia, Kudrinskaya Square and Red Gates Square buildings of 1947–1954). However, no part of the Ring was completely rebuilt in Stalinist style (or any other style). Any street of the Ring is a mixture of different style and sizes, from single-story 1820s mansions to recently built shopping malls and the 162-meter Swissotel in Red Hills (2005).

From the 1990s till 2010, the city government has proposed conversion of the Garden Ring to a one-way street, completely separated from radial street traffic. The public and professionals equally reject the idea of a one-way, 18-lane street.

Since 2010, with the arrival of the new city government, these plans were canceled. In 2016 a new reconstruction began. Trolleybus traffic was eliminated and replaced by diesel buses. All the unnecessarily wide sections of the Ring were narrowed down to 10 lanes, the width of each lane was also reduced and the sidewalks were expanded. All the overhead cables were dismantled and moved underground.

Composition

The Ring consists of the following streets and squares, in the clockwise direction,
 Kaluzhskaya Square
 Krymsky Val
 Crimean Square
 Zubovsky Boulevard
 Zubovskaya Square
 Smolensky Boulevard
 Smolenskaya-Sennaya Square
 Novinsky Boulevard
 Kudrinskaya Square
 Sadovaya-Kudrinskaya Street
 Bolshaya Sadovaya Street
 Triumphalnaya Square
 Sadovaya-Triumfalnaya Street
 Sadovaya-Karetnaya Street
 Sadovaya-Samotyochnaya Street
 Samotyochnaya Square
 Sadovaya-Sukharevskaya Street
 Malaya Sukharevskaya Square
 Bolshaya Sukharevskaya Square
 Sadovaya-Spasskaya Street
 Red Gate Square
 Sadovaya-Chernogryazskaya Street
 Zemlyanoy Val Square
 Zemlyanoy Val Street
 Serpukhov Square
 Korovy Val Street
 Zhitnaya Street
 Taganka Square
 Nizhnyaya Krasnokholmskaya Street
 Zatsepsky Val Street
 Valovaya Street

It crosses the Moskva River over two bridges, Bolshoy Krasnokholmsky Bridge (which connects the Taganka Square with Nizhnyaya Krasnokholmskaya Street) and Krymsky Bridge (which connects Krymsky Val Street and the Crimean Square). Maly Krasnokholmsky Bridge, connecting Nizhnyaya Krasnokholmskaya Street with Zatsepsky Val Street, is over the Vodootvodny Canal.

See also

 Boulevard Ring in Moscow
 Moscow Ring Road
 Third Ring Road in Moscow
 Ringstraße and Gürtel in Vienna
 Inner Ring Road in London

References

Ring roads in Moscow
Transport in Moscow